Alice May Cook née Barnett (1876–1960) was a British artist, notable as a miniature painter and book illustrator.

Biography
Cook was born in the Paddington area of London to Alice and John Francis Barnett, a pianist and member of the Royal Academy of Music. Aged 14, Cook enrolled in the St John's Wood School of Art and went on to study at the Royal Academy Schools.
Cook painted miniature portraits, often in watercolours, and created illustrations for children's books. She created over seventy-five illustrations, including fifteen colour plates for the 1915 book "Peggy's Travels". From 1907 to 1960 Cook exhibited a total of 51 works at the Royal Academy in London and also exhibited with the Royal Scottish Academy, the Society of Women Artists and also in Canada and South Africa.

Cook was an elected member of the Royal Miniature Society. She married a clerk, Walter Frank Cook, in 1899 and together they had seven children. Cook spent most of her life in London but also lived in Edinburgh and at Spixworth in Norfolk for periods and died at Colchester in Essex during 1960.

References

1876 births
1960 deaths
20th-century English painters
20th-century English women artists
Alumni of the Royal Academy Schools
Alumni of St John's Wood Art School
English illustrators
English women painters
Painters from London
People from Paddington